Agent tajne sile is the sixth studio album by Bosnian rock band Zabranjeno Pušenje, released in June 1999. It was released through Dancing Bear and TLN-Europa in Croatia, RENOME and Nimfa Sound in Bosnia and Herzegovina, and Active Time in Yugoslavia.

Track listing
Source: Discogs

Personnel 
Credits adapted from the album's liner notes.

Zabranjeno Pušenje
 Sejo Sexon – lead vocals, guitar, backing vocals
 Elvis J. Kurtovich – vocals, backing vocals
 Marin Gradac Mako – trombone, vocals, backing vocals 
 Predrag Bobić Bleka – bass
 Kristina Biluš – vocals, backing vocals
 Bruno Urlić Prco – violin, viola, keyboards, backing vocals
 Branko Trajkov Trak – drums, percussion, backing vocals
 Sejo Kovo – lead guitar, rhythm guitar

Additional musicians
 Cena von Vinkovci – accordion (track 2)
 Vlado Morrison – vocals (track 2)

Production
 Sejo Sexon – production
 Zlaja Hadžić Jeff – production, sound engineering
 Dario Vitez – executive production
 Branko Trajkov Trak – assistant

Design
Dario Vitez – design
Sejo Sexon – design
Haris Memija – photos

References

1999 albums
Zabranjeno Pušenje albums